Emanuel Günther (born 13 November 1954) is a German former professional footballer who played as a striker. He made 41 goals in 139 matches in the Bundesliga and 98 goals in 189 appearances in the 2. Bundesliga.

References

External links 
 
 

1954 births
Living people
People from Worms, Germany
German footballers
Association football forwards
Bundesliga players
2. Bundesliga players
Wormatia Worms players
Karlsruher SC players
Fortuna Düsseldorf players
1. FC Pforzheim players
Footballers from Rhineland-Palatinate